Nestegis  is a genus of flowering plant in the olive family, Oleaceae. There are five currently accepted species in the genus: three species are endemic to New Zealand, while one can be found on New Zealand and Norfolk Island. Another is restricted to Hawaii.

Some species of the related genus Osmanthus are sometimes included here.

Etymology
The name Nestegis is of unknown origin, since the author Constantine Samuel Rafinesque often invented generic names from scratch. It may have no meaning at all or it may derive from Greek stegos (στέγος) meaning "cover" in allusion to the lack of a corolla in the type species, Nestegis apetala.

Description
Nestegis species are evergreen trees or shrubs. The leaves are opposite, simple, entire, and coriaceous. The inflorescence is axillary, decussate, sometimes terminal and somewhat paniculate. The flowers are either bisexual or functionally unisexual. The corolla is either absent or four-lobed with a short tube. There are two or four stamens. The ovary is shaped like a flask. The fruit is a drupe containing a single seed.

Species
Currently accepted species:

 Nestegis apetala (Vahl) L.A.S.Johnson – New Zealand (where the common name is coastal maire or broad-leaved maire) and Norfolk Island (where it is called ironwood) 
 Nestegis cunninghamii (Hook.f.) L.A.S.Johnson – black maire (New Zealand)
 Nestegis lanceolata  – white maire (New Zealand)
 Nestegis montana (Hook.f.) L.A.S.Johnson in O.Degener – narrow-leaved maire (New Zealand)
 Nestegis sandwicensis (A.Gray) O.Deg., I.Deg. & L.A.S.Johnson – "olopua" (Hawaii) 

Formerly included:
Nestegis ligustrina  – privet mock olive (New South Wales, Tasmania and Victoria) formerly included in this genus but the name now considered a synonym of Notelaea ligustrina Vent.

References

 
Oleaceae genera